The Aerocon Dash-1.6 wingship was a proposed American ground-effect vehicle intended to carry large cargos and thousands of passengers over long distances at near-aircraft speeds.

The US Defense Advanced Research Projects Agency (DARPA) evaluated the Aerocon design, along with submissions from several other manufacturers, as part of a preliminary study of the concept during the 1990s to determine whether a billion-dollar program was viable, to develop a wingship for military uses. By the end of 1994, the Department of Defense decided that the design was too high a risk and did not offer further funding.

Specifications

See also 
 Beriev Be-2500
 Boeing Pelican
 Caspian Sea Monster
 HCA-LB
 Lun-class ekranoplan
 Spasatel

References

Notes

Bibliography 

 
 
 
 
 
 
 
 
 
 
 
 
 
 
 
 
 

Abandoned military projects of the United States
Ekranoplans

Abandoned civil aircraft projects of the United States
V-tail aircraft